Daphnella bertrandiana is an extinct species of sea snail, a marine gastropod mollusc in the family Raphitomidae.

Description

Distribution
Fossils of this extinct marine species were found in Lower Pliocene strata in France

References

 Millet de la Turtaudière P.A. (1865). Indicateur de Maine-et-Loire ou Indicateur par communes de ce que chacune d'elle renferme sous le rapport de la géographie, des productions naturelles, des monuments historiques, de l'industrie et du commerce. Tome 2, 616 pp. Angers: Cosnier et Lachèse.
 Ceulemans L., Van Dingenen F. & Landau B.M. (2018). The lower Pliocene gastropods of Le Pigeon Blanc (Loire- Atlantique, northwest France). Part 5 – Neogastropoda (Conoidea) and Heterobranchia (fine). Cainozoic Research. 18(2): 89-176
 Landau B.M., Van Dingenen F. & Ceulemans L. (2020). The upper Miocene gastropods of northwestern France, 5. Conoidea. Cainozoic Research. 20(1): 3–107.

bertrandiana
Gastropods described in 1865